Majorana may refer to:

 Majorana (surname), an Italian surname
 MAJORANA, a physics search for neutrinoless double-beta decay
 Majorana fermion
 Majorana Prize, a prize for theoretical and mathematical physics

See also

 Maiorana, a surname
 Majorna, a former borough of Gothenburg Municipality, Sweden
 Majorna (district), Gothenburg, Sweden